The World Rugby Referee Award (previously called IRB Referee Award for Distinguished Service) honours referees with a distinguished long-term service to the game and refereeing.

Recipients

References

External links 

 World Rugby Awards

World Rugby Awards
Rugby union referees